Mule Bone is an album by American blues artist Taj Mahal. All lyrics are by Langston Hughes. Taj Mahal was nominated for a Grammy Award for his music for the Broadway staging of the play of the same name.

Track listing
 "Jubilee (Opening Theme)"
 "Graveyard Mule (Hambone Rhyme)"
 "Me and the Mule"
 "Song for a Banjo Dance"
 "But I Rode Some"
 "Hey Hey Blues"
 "Shake That Thing"
 "Intermission Blues"
 "Crossing (Lonely Day)"
 "Bound No'th Blues"
 "Finale"

Personnel
Taj Mahal - keyboards, bass, guitar, harmonica, banjo
Abdul Wali - guitar
Calvin "Fuzzy" Samuel - bass
Kim Jordan - keyboards, synthesizer, percussion
Marc Singer, Mike Sena - drums, percussion

References

Taj Mahal (musician) albums
1991 albums